Banten Jaya Football Club (simply known as BJFC or Banten Jaya) is an Indonesian football club based in Serang, Banten. They currently compete in the Liga 3 and their homeground is Maulana Yusuf Stadium.

References

External links

Serang
Sport in Banten
Football clubs in Indonesia
Football clubs in Banten
Association football clubs established in 2018
2018 establishments in Indonesia